The wedgespot shiner (Notropis greenei) is a species of ray-finned fish in the genus Notropis. It is endemic to the United States, where it is found in the Ozark Uplands of the middle Arkansas River drainage of central Arkansas, northeastern Oklahoma, and southwestern Missouri.  It is also found in the White, Black, and St. Francis river systems of northern Arkansas and southeastern Missouri, and the Meramec, Gasconade, and lower Osage river systems of eastern Missouri.

References 

 Robert Jay Goldstein, Rodney W. Harper, Richard Edwards: American Aquarium Fishes. Texas A&M University Press 2000, p. 92
 

Notropis
Fish described in 1929
Cyprinid fish of North America
Fish of the United States